Carlo Giuseppe Merlo (5 November 1690 – 13 February 1760) was an Italian architect of the late-Baroque  period; born in Milan, Italy.
He was a pupil of  Francesco Bianchi, and from 1708 to 1716 trained in the College of Engineers and Architects in Milan. In 1716, he designed the Oratory for the church of San Bernardino, Milan (completed 1749).  In 1731, he designed the main altar for the Sanctuary of the ‘’Beata Vergine di Caravaggio’’. In 1740, he designed the Oratory of the Immacolata in ponte Vecchio di Magenta. Like most architects of Milan, he contributed to the continuing work for the Duomo.  In 1738, he designed and directed the construction of the entryway stairs for Palazzo Litta in Milan.

He helped rebuild the parochial church of  San Giuliana in Caponago. In 1739, he helped designs for a project in the Monastery of the Visitazione in Milan. He helped design the façade for the parochial church of Sant'Andrea Apostolo of Pioltello. In conjunction with Giulio Galliori he designed the ephemeral decorative car used to translate the body of San Carlo Borromeo. Again with Galliori he designed the cupola of the sanctuary of the Beata Vergine of Rho. He helped raise the belltower for the parochial church of Olginate. He also helped design a house for the poor and jail.

References 

1690 births
1760 deaths
18th-century Italian architects
Italian Baroque architects
Architects from Milan